Nicholas Ryan Kisner (born January 17, 1991) is an American professional boxer. He is currently signed to Jeter promotions.

Personal life
Kisner was born in Baltimore, Maryland. He is of Bavarian/Scottish descent on his father's side and Irish/Chechen descent on his mother's side. He grew up in South Baltimore and Northern Anne Arundel County. He began boxing at 6 years old under the tutelage of his father, a former boxer himself. He graduated from Old Mill Senior High School.

Amateur career
As an amateur boxer he accomplished three National Silver Gloves Championships, two Junior National Golden Gloves Championships, Junior Olympic gold medal, Ringside World Championship, Ohio State Fair Championship, Under-19 National Championship, and a National Pal Championship, where he defeated 2012-2016 Olympian Cam Awesome (formally Lenroy Thompson) in the finals.

In 2009, he captured a silver medal at the US Men's National Championships, giving him a position on the USA Men's International team. In 2008, he reached the quarter finals at both the National Golden Gloves and the AIBA Youth World Championships in Guadalajara, Mexico. At the latter, he was defeated by 2012 and 2016 Olympic bronze medalist Ivan Dychko of Kazakhstan 5–1.

Professional career
Shortly after winning the silver medal at the US Men's National Championships, Kisner decided to turn professional. Kisner made his debut January 31, 2010, against world ranked kickboxer, Francois Ambang.

He went 12–0–1 in his first 13 matches before losing a split decision against fellow undefeated boxer Junior Wright.  In 2015, he lost a competitive, 10-round decision on CBS sports network to former World title challenger, and boxing superstar Lateef Kayode.  Several fights later, he defeated ranked contender Brian Holstein in Columbus, Ohio to capture the WBA USA National Championship title.

In 2017, Kisner traveled to Belgium to fight Ryad Merhy in a match for the WBA Intercontinental title, losing in the fourth round.

In 2018, Kisner defended his title in a rematch against Brian Holstein in Columbus, Ohio. A few months later, he then fought against USBA #15 contender Scott Sigmon in a 10 round bout, for the NABP Cruiserweight Championship in July 2018. Kisner went on to win a 10 round decision in the bout, to capture the North American Boxing Partners (NABP) Cruiserweight title.

In April 2019, Kisner moved up to the heavyweight division to challenge European champion Otto Wallin on Showtime. The fight was called a no contest after the first round after Kisner sufferered a cut over his right eye from a headbutt from Wallin early in the first round.

He then in February 2020 dropped back down to the cruiserweight division to take on undefeated Sam Crossed for the Maryland state cruiserweight title in a highly anticipated local fight. Due to the Maryland State Boxing Commission still keeping the cruiserweight limit at the original weight of 190 lbs, Kisner weighed in at a career low of 190 lbs, for the state title fight. Kisner went on to dominate Crossed over 10 rounds to collect the state title.

It was then announced later in the year of 2020, Kisner would challenge then champion Beibut Shumenov for the WBA Cruiserweight World Championship in December. The fight was later on postponed, and then the fight was cancelled shortly after that.

Professional boxing record

|-style="text-align:center; background:#e3e3e3;"
|style="border-style:none none solid solid; "|
|style="border-style:none none solid solid; "|Result
|style="border-style:none none solid solid; "|Record
|style="border-style:none none solid solid; "|Opponent
|style="border-style:none none solid solid; "|Type
|style="border-style:none none solid solid; "|Rounds
|style="border-style:none none solid solid; "|Date
|style="border-style:none none solid solid; "|Location
|style="border-style:none none solid solid; "|Notes
|- align=center
|28
|Loss
|21–5–1 (1)
|align=left| Danny Kelly
|
|
|
|align=left|
|align=left|
|- align=center
|27
|style="background:#DDD"|
|21–4–1 (1)
|align=left| Otto Wallin
|
|
|
|align=left|
|align=left|
|- align=center
|26
|Win
|21–4–1
|align=left| Scott Sigmon
|
|
|
|align=left|
|align=left|
|- align=center
|25
|Win
|20–4–1
|align=left| Brian Holstein
|
|
|
|align=left|
|align=left|
|- align=center
|24
|Loss
|19–4–1
|align=left| Ryad Merhy
|
|
|
|align=left|
|align=left|
|- align=center
|23
|Win
|19–3–1
|align=left| Lamont Singletary
|
|
|
|align=left|
|align=left|
|- align=center
|22
|Win
|18–3–1
|align=left| Brian Holstein
|
|
|
|align=left|
|align=left|
|- align=center
|21
|Win
|17–3–1
|align=left| Steven Tyner
|
|
|
|align=left|
|align=left|
|- align=center
|20
|Loss
|16–3–1
|align=left| Lamont Capers
|
|
|
|align=left|
|align=left|
|- align=center
|19
|Win
|16–2–1
|align=left| Daniel Shull
|
|
|
|align=left|
|align=left|
|- align=center
|18
|Win
|15–2–1
|align=left| James Jones
|
|
|
|align=left|
|align=left|
|- align=center
|17
|Loss
|14–2–1
|align=left| Lateef Kayode
|
|
|
|align=left|
|align=left|
|- align=center
|16
|Win
|14–1–1
|align=left| Marlon Hayes
|
|
|
|align=left|
|align=left|
|- align=center
|15
|Win
|13–1–1
|align=left| Pedro Martinez
|
|
|
|align=left|
|align=left|
|- align=center
|14
|Loss
|12–1–1
|align=left| Junior Anthony Wright
|
|
|
|align=left|
|align=left|
|- align=center
|13
|Win
|12–0–1
|align=left| Willie Chisolm
|
|
|
|align=left|
|align=left|
|- align=center
|12
|Win
|11–0–1
|align=left| Jermaine Walker
|
|
|
|align=left|
|align=left|
|- align=center
|11
|Win
|10–0–1
|align=left| Rayshawn Myers
|
|
|
|align=left|
|align=left|
|- align=center
|10
|Win
|9–0–1
|align=left| DeLeon Tinsley
|
|
|
|align=left|
|align=left|
|- align=center
|9
|Draw
|8–0–1
|align=left| Andre Ward
|
|
|
|align=left|
|align=left|
|- align=center
|8
|Win
|8–0
|align=left| Leo Bercier
|
|
|
|align=left|
|align=left|
|- align=center
|7
|Win
|7–0
|align=left| James Pratt
|
|
|
|align=left|
|align=left|
|- align=center
|6
|Win
|6–0
|align=left| Kenneth Farr
|
|
|
|align=left|
|align=left|
|- align=center
|5
|Win
|5–0
|align=left| Robert Hunt
|
|
|
|align=left|
|align=left|
|- align=center
|4
|Win
|4–0
|align=left| Tauheed Wheeler
|
|
|
|align=left|
|align=left|
|- align=center
|3
|Win
|3–0
|align=left| Octavius Davis
|
|
|
|align=left|
|align=left|
|- align=center
|2
|Win
|2–0
|align=left| Kevin Johnson
|
|
|
|align=left|
|align=left|
|- align=center
|1
|Win
|1–0
|align=left| Francois Ambag
|
|
|
|align=left|
|align=left|

Titles in boxing
 WBA-NABA USA cruiserweight title

References

External links
 

1991 births
Living people
American male boxers
Boxers from Baltimore
Cruiserweight boxers